Rabenau is a municipality in the district of Gießen, in Hesse, Germany.

References

Giessen (district)